Waddon railway station is in the London Borough of Croydon in south London. The station and all trains serving it are operated by Southern.

Accidents and incidents
On 4 November 1942, two electric multiple units collided due to a signalman's error: two people were killed.

Services
All services at Waddon are operated by Southern using  EMUs.

The typical off-peak service in trains per hour is:
 2 tph to  via 
 2 tph to 
 2 tph to 

Connections
London Buses routes 154, 157 and 289 serve the station.

References

External links 

Railway stations in the London Borough of Croydon
Former London, Brighton and South Coast Railway stations
Railway stations in Great Britain opened in 1863
Railway stations served by Govia Thameslink Railway
James Robb Scott buildings